Thor 1 may refer to:
 Thor 1-A, a version of the Thor T/A ultralight aircraft
 Thor 1 or Marcopolo 2, a satellite in the Thor family of satellites

See also
 Thor (film), a 2011 American superhero film
 Thor (disambiguation)